Sainte-Foy–Sillery–Cap-Rouge is a borough of Quebec City, Quebec, Canada.

The borough was created on November 1, 2009, from the former borough of Sainte-Foy–Sillery and part of the former borough of Laurentien.  Those boroughs in turn had been created on January 1, 2002; on that date, the former city of Cap-Rouge, a small part of the former city of Sainte-Foy, and other territory went into Laurentien, while the former city of Sillery and the rest of Sainte-Foy formed Sainte-Foy–Sillery.

See also
 Municipal reorganization in Quebec
 Louis-Hébert (electoral district)
 Jean-Talon

References

External links
  
 
 

Boroughs of Quebec City